The 1954 Liverpool West Derby by-election was held on 18 November 1954 after the incumbent Conservative MP, David Maxwell Fyfe was elevated to a hereditary peerage.  The seat was retained by the Conservative candidate John Woollam.

References

1954 elections in the United Kingdom
1954 in England
West Derby, 1954
1950s in Liverpool